The 2006–07 Butler Bulldogs men's basketball team represented Butler University in the 2006–07 NCAA Division I men's basketball season. Their head coach was Todd Lickliter, serving his 6th year. The Bulldogs played their home games at the Hinkle Fieldhouse.

The Bulldogs won the 2007 Horizon League Men's Basketball Regular Season Championship and earned an at-large bid to the 2007 NCAA Division I men's basketball tournament, earning a 5 seed in the Midwest Region. They beat 12 seed Old Dominion 57–46 and 4 seed Maryland before falling to 1 seed and eventual national champion Florida 65–57 in overtime in the Sweet Sixteen

Roster

Schedule

|-
!colspan=9 style="background:#13294B; color:#FFFFFF;"| Non-conference regular season

|-
!colspan=12 style="background:#13294B; color:#FFFFFF;"| Horizon League Play

|-
!colspan=9 style="background:#13294B; color:#FFFFFF;"| Horizon League tournament

|-
!colspan=9 style="background:#13294B; color:#FFFFFF;"| NCAA tournament

Rankings

References

Butler
Butler Bulldogs men's basketball seasons
Butler
Butl
Butl